The following is a list of players who have appeared at least in one game for the Alaska Aces PBA franchise.



A

B

C

D

E

F

G

H

I

J

K

L

M

N

O

P

Q

R

S

T

V

W

Y

References